Alkesh Arya is an Indian politician and member of the Bharatiya Janata Party. Arya is a member of the Madhya Pradesh Legislative Assembly from the Betul constituency in Betul district.

References 

People from Betul district
Bharatiya Janata Party politicians from Madhya Pradesh
Madhya Pradesh MLAs 2013–2018
Living people
Year of birth missing (living people)